The String Quartet No. 1 is the first string quartet by the American composer Christopher Rouse.  The work was commissioned by the Casella Quartet and completed on June 7, 1982.

Composition

Structure
The work has a duration of roughly 16 minutes and is composed in six movements:
Variazioni I
Fantasma di Bartok I
Variazioni Piccoli
Fantasma di Bartok II
Variazioni II
Epilogo

Inspiration
The work was primarily inspired by Béla Bartók's String Quartet No. 4 and the assassination of Anwar Sadat, about which Rouse commented in the score program notes:

Reception
Edward Rothstein of The New York Times praised the string quartet, remarking that "the work's outbursts seemed insistent and intemperate".  Reviewing a later recording of the piece, the music critic James Manheim praised the music for "draw[ing] closely on specific models and amplify[ing] them with big, visceral effects."  He added:

References

Rouse 1
1982 compositions